During the 2004–05 English football season, Millwall competed in the Football League Championship.

Season summary
In the UEFA Cup, Millwall lost 4–2 on aggregate in the first round proper, to Hungarian Champions Ferencváros, with Wise scoring both Millwall goals. Millwall put up a brave fight in both games, but the Hungarian champions were too strong. Surprisingly, whilst Millwall were seeded, Ferencvaros were not. Millwall could have had an easier draw, against Chechnyan minnows Terek Grozny. If Millwall had beaten them, then they would have made it into the group stage of the competition, where they would have faced some of Europe's elite, including teams such as Lazio and Schalke.

In 2005, Theo Paphitis announced that he was stepping down as chairman of the club with Jeff Burnige to replace him from May 2005. At the end of the 2004–05 season, manager Dennis Wise announced that he was leaving as he was unable to form a working relationship with the new chairman.

Final league table

Results
Millwall's score comes first

Legend

Football League Championship table

FA Cup

League Cup

UEFA Cup

Players

First-team squad
Squad at end of season

Left club during season

Reserve squad

Notes

References

Millwall F.C. seasons
Millwall F.C.